Clément Berthet (born 2 August 1997) is a French road cyclist and former cross-country mountain biker, who currently rides for UCI WorldTeam .

References

External links 

1997 births
Living people
French male cyclists
Sportspeople from Lyon Metropolis
Cyclists from Auvergne-Rhône-Alpes